In video games, a boss is a significant computer-controlled opponent. A fight with a boss character is commonly referred to as a boss battle or boss fight. Bosses are generally far stronger than other opponents the player has faced up to that point. Boss battles are generally seen at climax points of particular sections of games, such as at the end of a level or stage or guarding a specific objective. A miniboss is a boss weaker or less significant than the main boss in the same area or level, though usually more powerful than the standard opponents and often fought alongside them. A superboss (sometimes 'secret' or 'hidden' boss) is generally much more powerful than the bosses encountered as part of the main game's plot and is often an optional encounter. A final boss is often the main antagonist of a game's story and the defeat of that character usually provides a positive conclusion to the game. A boss rush is a stage where the player faces multiple previous bosses again in succession.

For example, in a run 'n' gun video game, all regular enemies might use pistols while the boss uses a tank. A boss enemy is quite often larger in size than other enemies and the player character. At times, bosses are very hard, even impossible, to defeat without being adequately prepared and/or knowing the correct fighting approach. Bosses usually take strategy and special knowledge to defeat, such as how to attack weak points or avoid specific attacks.

Bosses are common in many genres of video games, but they are especially common in story-driven titles, and are commonly previously established antagonists in the plot of the video game. Action-adventures, beat 'em ups, fighting games, platform games, role-playing video games (RPGs), and shooter games are particularly associated with boss battles. They may be less common in puzzle games, card video games, sports games, and simulation games. The first video game with a boss fight was the 1975 RPG dnd.

The concept has expanded to new genres, like rhythm games, where there may be a "boss song" that is more difficult. In MOBA games, defeating a map boss usually requires help from the other players, but it brings various benefits to the team, such as buffs or lane push power. Some games, such as Cuphead, Furi and Warning Forever, are centered around continual boss fights.

Characteristics
Bosses are usually harder to beat than regular enemies, can sustain more damage and are generally found at the end of a level or area. While most games include a mixture of boss opponents and regular opponents, some games have only regular opponents and some games have only bosses (e.g. Shadow of the Colossus). Some bosses are encountered several times through a single game, typically with alternate attacks and a different strategy required to defeat it each time. A boss battle can also be made more challenging if the boss in question becomes progressively stronger and/or less vulnerable as their health decreases, requiring players to use different strategies to win. Some bosses may contain or be composed of smaller parts that can be destroyed by the player in battle, which may or may not grant an advantage. In games such as Doom and Castlevania: Symphony of the Night, an enemy may be introduced via a boss battle, but later appear as a regular enemy, after the player has become stronger or had a chance to find more powerful weaponry.

The Legend of Zelda series and games inspired by it are recognized for having dungeons with bosses that are specifically vulnerable to a special item that is located within that dungeon. The player typically acquires this item while exploring the dungeon and is given opportunity to learn to use it to solve puzzles or defeat weaker enemies before facing the boss character.

Boss battles are typically seen as dramatic events. As such, they are usually characterized by unique music and cutscenes before and after the boss battle. Recurring bosses and final bosses may have their own specific theme music to distinguish them from other boss battles. This concept extends beyond combat-oriented video games. For example, a number of titles in the Dance Dance Revolution rhythm game series contain "boss songs" that are called "bosses" because they are exceptionally difficult to perform on.

In combat-focused games, a boss may summon additional enemies or minions or simply "adds", for players to fight alongside the boss. These additional enemies may distract from the boss battle or give time for the boss to regenerate health, but may also give the player opportunity to regain health and ammo to continue the boss fight.

Specific boss types

Miniboss

A miniboss, also known as a "middle boss", "mid-boss", "half-boss", "sub-boss" or "semi-boss", is a boss weaker or less significant than the main boss in the same area or level. Some minibosses are stronger versions of regular enemies, as in the Kirby games. Others may be a recurring version of a previous boss, who is either weaker than previously encountered or is less of a challenge later in the game due to character or equipment progression. Other video game characters who usually take the role of a miniboss are Vile (Mega Man X series), Allen O'Neil (Metal Slug) and Dark Link (The Legend of Zelda series, though he appears as a final boss in Zelda II: The Adventure of Link). There is also a subtype nicknamed the "Wolfpack Boss", for its similarity to a pack of wolves, often consisting of a group of strong normal enemies that are easy to defeat on their own, but a group of them can be as difficult as a boss battle.

Superboss
A superboss is a type of boss most commonly found in role-playing video games. They are considered optional enemies and do not have to be defeated to complete the game. However, not all optional bosses are superbosses. They are generally much more powerful than the bosses encountered as part of the main game's plot or quest, more difficult even than the final boss and often the player is required to complete a sidequest or the entire game to fight the superboss. For example, in Final Fantasy VII, the player may choose to seek out and fight the Ruby and Emerald Weapons. Some superbosses will take the place of the final boss if certain requirements are met. This is common in fighting games such as Akuma in Super Street Fighter II Turbo. Some superbosses can also yield special items or skills that cannot be found any other way that can give a player a significant advantage during playthrough of the rest of the game, such as added experience or an extremely powerful weapon. For example, the "raid bosses" from Borderlands 2 give rare loot unavailable anywhere else. Some superbosses in online games have an immense amount of health and must be defeated within a time limit by having a large number of players or parties working together to defeat the boss. Examples of such superbosses can be found in games like Shadow Fight 2 and Star Wars: Galaxy of Heroes. Toby Fox's games Undertale and Deltarune both feature superbosses in the form of Sans the Skeleton, Jevil, and Spamton NEO. Some major video game series have recurring superbosses such as the Ultima Weapon and Omega Weapon in Final Fantasy and the Amon clan in Yakuza. The Warden from Minecraft could be considered a superboss, as it is vastly more difficult to fight than the final boss, the Ender Dragon. However, Mojang has explicitly stated that the Warden was not intended to be fought by players.

Final boss

The final boss, last boss or end boss, is typically present at or near the end of a game, with completion of the game's storyline usually following victory in the battle. The final boss is usually the main antagonist of the game; however, there are exceptions, such as in Conker's Bad Fur Day, in which the final boss is the antagonist's alien pet. Final bosses are generally larger, more detailed and better animated than lesser enemies, often in order to inspire a feeling of grandeur and special significance from the encounter.

In some games, a hidden boss, referred to as the "true" final boss, is present. These bosses only appear after the completion of specific additional levels, choosing specific dialogue options or after obtaining a particular item or set of items, such as the Chaos Emeralds in the Sonic the Hedgehog series or performing a series of tasks in Metal Gear Solid: Peace Walker. These bosses are generally more difficult to defeat. In games with a "true" final boss, victory leads to either a better ending or a more detailed version of the regular ending. Examples of a "true final boss" include the Radiance in Hollow Knight, Indalecio in Star Ocean: The Second Story, the Moon Presence in Bloodborne, Zero in Kirby's Dream Land 3 and Unknown in ActRaiser Renaissance.

The term "Foozle" is used to describe a cliché final boss that exists only to act as the final problem before a player can complete the game. Scorpia stated in 1994 that "about 98% of all role-playing video games can be summed up as follows: 'We go out and bash on critters until we're strong enough to go bash on Foozle.'"

History
The origin of naming the final enemy in a level or game a "boss" cannot be readily traced, but Kotaku points to the term coming from the crime boss of a criminal gang. A precursor to video-game boss fights is Bruce Lee's Hong Kong martial arts films, including The Big Boss (1971), in which Lee fights a criminal gang before battling the big boss, and Game of Death (1972), where Lee fights a different boss on each level of a pagoda, which later inspired the boss battles of martial arts action games such as beat 'em ups. Another precursor is tabletop role-playing games starting with Dungeons & Dragons (1974), in which in a typical dungeon campaign there would be one powerful enemy acting as the boss of the weaker minions that players would face beforehand, in the same sense as a crime boss, which later inspired the boss battles of role-playing video games.

The first interactive video game to feature a boss was dnd, a 1975 role-playing video game for the PLATO system. One of the earliest dungeon crawls, dnd implemented many of the core concepts of Dungeons & Dragons. The objective of the game is to retrieve an "Orb" from the bottommost dungeon. The orb is kept in a treasure room guarded by a high-level enemy named the Gold Dragon. Only by defeating the Dragon can the player claim the orb, complete the game and be eligible to appear on the high score list.

In 1980, boss battles appeared in several arcade action games. In March 1980, Sega released Samurai, a jidaigeki-themed martial arts action game where the player samurai fights a number of swordsmen before confronting a more powerful boss samurai. SNK's Sasuke vs. Commander, released in October 1980, is a ninja-themed shooting game where the player character fights enemy ninjas before confronting bosses with various ninjutsu attacks and enemy patterns. It was one of the earliest games with multiple boss encounters, and one of SNK's earliest games. Phoenix, released in December 1980, is a fixed shooter where the player ship must fight a giant mothership in the fifth and final level. At several points in Namco's vertically scrolling shooter Xevious (1982), the player must defeat an Andor Genesis mothership to advance.

In side-scrolling character action games such as beat 'em ups, Irem's 1984 arcade game Kung-Fu Master established the end-of-level boss battle structure used in these games, with the player character progressing through levels (represented by floors of a temple) and fighting a boss character at the end of each level; in turn, this end-of-level boss battle structure was adapted from the Bruce Lee film Game of Death, where Lee's character fights a different boss character on each floor as he ascends a pagoda. The game was distinctive for giving both the player character and each boss a health meter, which leads to the game temporarily becoming a one-on-one fighting game during boss battles, a concept that Kung-Fu Master designer Takashi Nishiyama later expanded on when he created the fighting game Street Fighter (1987) at Capcom. The term "boss" was used in reference to the game's final boss by Mike Roberts in a review of the game published in the May 1985 issue of British magazine Computer Gamer, while he used the term "super baddies" for the end-of-level bosses.

Sega's arcade game Fantasy Zone (1986) popularized the concept of a boss rush, a stage where the player faces multiple previous bosses again in succession. American magazine Nintendo Power has been credited with popularizing the term "boss" for video games around 1988.

See also

 Glossary of video game terms

References

 
Video game terminology
1975 neologisms